Simhendramadhyamam is a ragam in Carnatic music (musical scale of South Indian classical music). It is the 57th melakarta rāgam in the 72 melakarta rāgam system of Carnatic music. It is called Sumadyuti in Muthuswami Dikshitar school of Carnatic music. It is said to be borrowed into Hindustani music from Carnatic music.

Structure and Lakshana

It is the 3rd rāgam in the 10th chakra Disi. The mnemonic name is Disi-Go. The mnemonic phrase is sa ri gi mi pa dha ni. Its  structure (ascending and descending scale) is as follows (see swaras in Carnatic music for details on below notation and terms):
: 
: 

It is also equivalent to Hungarian Minor Scale that is also called as Gypsy Minor Scale in Western Music.

This musical scale uses the notes chatushruti rishabham, sadharana gandharam, prati madhyamam, shuddha daivatam and kakali nishadham. As it is a melakarta rāgam, by definition it is a sampūrṇa rāgam (has all seven notes in ascending and descending scale). It is the prati madhyamam equivalent of Kiraṇāvali ( also known by name kīravāṇi ), which is the 21st melakarta.

Janya rāgams 
Simhendramadhyamam has a few minor janya rāgams (derived scales) associated with it, of which Vijaya Saraswati, a scale first used by Muthiah Bhagavatar is sung in concerts. See List of janya rāgams for all scales associated with Simhendramadhyamam.

Compositions
Here are a few common compositions sung in concerts, set to Simhendramadhyamam.

Needu charanamule by Tyagaraja 
Kamakshi Kamakoti peetha vaasini by Muthuswami Dikshitar (with rāgam name sumadyuti mudra in it)
Pamarajanapalini by Muthuswami Dikshitar (with rāgam name sumadyuti mudra in it)
Ashaindhadum mayil onDru by Oottukkadu Venkata Kavi
Ninne Nammithi nayya by Mysore Vasudevacharya
Innum orutharam by Muthu Thandavar
Ayyappa by Yesudas
unnaiyallAl vErE gati by Koteeswara Iyer
Rama rama guna seema by Swathi Thirunal Rama Varma
Marakata Simhasana by M. Balamuralikrishna
"Iha Param yennum" by Pabanasamsivan

Here two famous Bengali songs composed by Rabindranath Tagore & Kazi Nazrul Islam, set to Simhendramadhyamam.
 Baje Koruno Sure (Rabindra Sangeet)
 Paradesi Megh Jao Re fire (Nazrul Geeti)

Film songs

Language: Tamil

Related rāgams
This section covers the theoretical and scientific aspect of this rāgam.

Simhendramadhyamam's notes when shifted using Graha bhedam, yields 2 other melakarta rāgams, namely, Mayamalavagowla and Rasikapriya. Graha bhedam is the step taken in keeping the relative note frequencies same, while shifting the shadjam to the next note in the rāgam. For further details and an illustration refer Graha bhedam on Mayamalavagowla.

Notes

References

Melakarta ragas